The following is a list of British podcasts.

List

See also 

 Mass media in the United Kingdom
 Radio in the United Kingdom

References

External links 
  on Player FM

British

Podcasts